Sitora may refer to:
 Sitora, a given name
 Sitora Dushanbe, a football club